Douglas John Kirby is the co-author of the Roadside America series of travel books, and its associated website. The series has been reviewed by The Village Voice and Car and Driver, and was featured on The Oprah Winfrey Show. Kirby appears in the documentary In a Nutshell: A Portrait of Elizabeth Tashjian. He graduated from Rowan University in 1979.

References

External links
 Roadside America
 Rowan University Magazine profile of Kirby
 IMDb

1957 births
Kirby, Doug
Rowan University alumni
Kirby, Doug